The Dhankhali River is located in Bangladesh. It is one of the major rivers of Kalapara Upazila in Patuakhali District, and flows into the Rabnabad Channel.

References

Rivers of Bangladesh
Rivers of Barisal Division